
Oleśnica County is a unit of territorial administration and local government (powiat) in Lower Silesian Voivodeship, south-western Poland. It was created on January 1, 1999, as a result of the Polish local government reforms passed in 1998. Its administrative seat is the town of Oleśnica, and it also contains the towns of Syców, Twardogóra, Bierutów and Międzybórz.

As of 2019 the total population of the county is 107,090. The most populated towns are Oleśnica with 37,169 inhabitants and Syców is 10,397 inhabitants.

Neighbouring counties
Oleśnica County is bordered by Milicz County and Ostrów Wielkopolski County to the north, Ostrzeszów County, Kępno County and Namysłów County to the east, Oława County to the south, and Wrocław County and Trzebnica County to the west.

Administrative division
The county is subdivided into eight gminas (one urban, four urban-rural and three rural). These are listed in the following table, in descending order of population.

References

 
Land counties of Lower Silesian Voivodeship